Laëtitia Grand (born July 26, 1990) is a French rugby union player. She represented  at the 2014 Women's Rugby World Cup and was also a member of the squad that won their fourth Six Nations title in 2014.

References

1990 births
Living people
French female rugby union players